Khatib Said Haji (31 July 1962 – 20 May 2021) was a Tanzanian ACT Wazalendo politician and Member of Parliament for the Konde constituency from 2010 until his death. He was also the Minister of Agriculture of Zanzibar from 1984 to 1987. He died on 20 May 2021 as he was undergoing treatment at the Muhimbili National Hospital. He was the third member to die during the 12th Tanzanian Parliament.

References

1962 births
2021 deaths
Civic United Front MPs
Tanzanian MPs 2010–2015
Konde Secondary School alumni
Utaani Secondary School alumni
Zanzibari politicians
Alliance for Change and Transparency politicians